Archips breviplicanus, the Asiatic leafroller, is a species of moth of the family Tortricidae. It is found in Japan, South Korea, China (Heilongjiang, Jilin) and Russia (Ussuri, Amur).

The moth is 16–24 mm for males and 23–28 mm for females. There are two to three generations per year with adults on wing in June and August.

The larvae feed on Malus (including Malus pumila), Pyrus, Alnus and Morus species, as well as Glycine max. They roll the leaves of their host plant. The species overwinters in the larval stage.

References

Moths described in 1900
Archips
Moths of Asia